Open Window School is an independent K-8 school for students who have been formally identified as intellectually gifted. Open Window School is located in Bellevue, Washington on top of Cougar Mountain, which is on the outer edge of the city across Lake Washington. Open Window School is a member of the Northwest Association of Independent Schools (NWAIS), the National Association of Independent Schools, and the Washington Federation of Independent Schools (WFIS)

Achievements
Open Window School's use of technology extends from Innovation and Technology Labs to the school's use of social media. Innovation and Technology Director Adrienne Gifford was named Northwest Council for Computer Education (NCCE) Technology Leader of the Year in 2016. In early 2014, a group of five seventh graders won the highest honor, "Best in Nation", in the second Verizon Innovative App Challenge for the app they created. In January 2015, a project by a sixth grader won first prize in the Future Engineers 3D Printing Space Challenge. This pupil designed a Space Planter to be 3D printed on the International Space Station. A group of five middle school students won the 2016 Verizon App Challenge Best in Region Award, designing an app to serve patients with neurological diseases.

During the 2015–16 school year, Open Window was one of 22 schools in the United States and Canada invited to participate in the Student Spaceflight Experiments Program. Working in collaborative teams, fourth through eighth-grade students designed microgravity experiments and an outside panel of researchers chose one of the seventh-grade experiments to be conducted on the International Space Station.

In the 2020–2021 school year, two fifth graders, Jacob Park and Julia Stewart won first place nationally in the ExploraVision competition, with their solar-powered "Coagulation Filtration System" which utilizes Ideonella sakaiensis microbes to break down microplastics for drinking water.

Athletics & extra-curricular programs
The school's athletic programs currently include cross country, golf, tennis, basketball, soccer, Ultimate Frisbee, track and field, and volleyball. The Girl's Volleyball team completed an undefeated season in 2014. The school mascot is Rufus the Bobcat, who eighth graders may portray in costume at various school events. In addition to athletics, the school offers students the opportunity to compete in after-school activities including chess, debate, Model United Nations, and robotics.

Gallery

References

External links
School website
NWAIS (Northwest Association of Independent Schools)

Schools in Seattle
Private elementary schools in Washington (state)
Private middle schools in Washington (state)
Educational institutions established in 1985
1985 establishments in Washington (state)